These 434 genera belong to Rhyparochrominae, a subfamily of dirt-colored seed bugs in the family Rhyparochromidae. There are more than 2,100 described species in Rhyparochrominae.

Rhyparochrominae genera

 Family Rhyparochromidae 
 Genus Amicrops Montrouzier, 1858
 Genus Anisocoris Walker, 1872
 Subfamily Plinthisinae 
 Genus Bosbequius Distant, 1904
 Genus Plinthisus Stephens, 1829
 Subfamily Rhyparochrominae 
 Tribe Antillocorini 
 Genus Acolhua Distant, 1893
 Genus Antillocoris Kirkaldy, 1904
 Genus Antillodema Slater, 1980
 Genus Arimacoris Baranowski & Slater, 1987
 Genus Baeocoris Slater, 1983
 Genus Bathydema Uhler, 1893
 Genus Bocundostethus Scudder, 1962
 Genus Botocudo Kirkaldy, 1904
 Genus Branstettocoris Brailovsky, 2010
 Genus Caeneusia Strand, 1928
 Genus Caymanis Baranowski & Brambila, 2001
 Genus Cligenes Distant, 1893
 Genus Gemmacoris Baranowski & Slater, 1987
 Genus Homoscelis Horvath, 1884
 Genus Iodinus Lindberg, 1927
 Genus Kinundastethus Scudder, 1962
 Genus Lethaeaster Breddin, 1905
 Genus Lethaeastroides Malipatil & Woodward, 1989
 Genus Microcoris Bergroth, 1908
 Genus Microlugenocoris Scudder, 1962
 Genus Neopoliocoris Zhang & Chen, 2015
 Genus Nympholethaeus Woodward, 1959
 Genus Paradema Slater, 1980
 Genus Paurocoris Slater, 1980
 Genus Polycligenes Scudder, 1962
 Genus Pulmomerus Cervantes & Brailovsky, 2012
 Genus Schuhocoris Slater, 1985
 Genus Scythinus Distant, 1893
 Genus Siniasinensis Scudder, 1968
 Genus Terenocoris Slater, 1980
 Genus Tomocoris Woodward, 1953
 Genus Tomocoroides Woodward, 1963
 Genus Trachinocoris Slater, 1980
 Genus Tropistethus Fieber, 1861
 Genus Valeris Brambila, 2000
 Tribe Cleradini 
 Genus Arcleda Malipatil, 1981
 Genus Austroclerada Malipatil, 1981
 Genus Clerada Signoret, 1863
 Genus Clerocarbus Scudder, 1969
 Genus Dendezia Scudder, 1963
 Genus Dyakana Distant, 1906
 Genus Harmostica Bergroth, 1918
 Genus Kanadyana Scudder, 1963
 Genus Laticlerada Malipatil, 1981
 Genus Mahisa Distant, 1906
 Genus Navarrus Distant, 1901
 Genus Neoclerada Malipatil, 1981
 Genus Pactye Stal, 1865
 Genus Panchaea Stal, 1865
 Genus Paramahisa Malipatil, 1981
 Genus Parapactye Malipatil, 1983
 Genus Pholeolygaeus Deboutteville & Paulian, 1952
 Genus Prehensocoris Harrington, 1988
 Genus Reclada White, 1878
 Tribe Drymini 
 Genus Appolonius Distant, 1901
 Genus Austrodrymus Gross, 1965
 Genus Bexiocoris Scudder, 1969
 Genus Borneodrymus Kondorosy, 2006
 Genus Brachydrymus Gross, 1965
 Genus Brentiscerus Scudder, 1962
 Genus Carvalhodrymus Slater, 1995
 Genus Chotekia China, 1935
 Genus Coracodrymus Breddin, 1901
 Genus Drymus Fieber, 1861
 Genus Dudia Bergroth, 1918
 Genus Entisberus Distant, 1903
 Genus Eremocoris Fieber, 1861
 Genus Esinerus Scudder, 1969
 Genus Faelicianus Distant, 1901
 Genus Gastrodes Westwood, 1840
 Genus Gastrodomorpha Gross, 1965
 Genus Grossander Slater, 1976
 Genus Heissodrymus Kondorosy, 2006
 Genus Hidakacoris Tomokuni, 1998
 Genus Hirtomydrus Scudder, 1978
 Genus Ibexocoris Scudder, 1963
 Genus Ischnocoris Fieber, 1861
 Genus Kanigara Distant, 1906
 Genus Lamproplax Douglas & Scott, 1868
 Genus Latidrymus Kondorosy, 2017
 Genus Lemnius Distant, 1904
 Genus Malipatilius Kondorosy, 2013
 Genus Megadrymus Gross, 1965
 Genus Mizaldus Distant, 1901
 Genus Neodudia Scudder, 1978
 Genus Neomizaldus Scudder, 1968
 Genus Notochilaster Breddin, 1907
 Genus Notochilus Fieber, 1864
 Genus Orsillodes Puton, 1884
 Genus Paradieuches Distant, 1883
 Genus Paradrymus Bergroth, 1916
 Genus Parastilbocoris Carayon, 1964
 Genus Pilusodrymus Scudder, 1969
 Genus Potamiaena Distant, 1910
 Genus Pseudodrymus Gross, 1965
 Genus Retoka China, 1935
 Genus Retrodrymus Gross, 1965
 Genus Rhodiginus Distant, 1901
 Genus Salaciola Bergroth, 1906
 Genus Scolopostethus Fieber, 1861
 Genus Sinierus Distant, 1901
 Genus Stilbocoris Bergroth, 1893
 Genus Taphropeltus Stal, 1872
 Genus Testudodrymus Slater, 1993
 Genus Thaumastopus Fieber, 1870
 Genus Thebanus Distant, 1904
 Genus Thylochromus Barber, 1928
 Genus Togodolentus Barber, 1918
 Genus Trichodrymus Lindberg, 1927
 Genus Udalricus Distant, 1904
 Genus Usilanus Distant, 1909
 Genus Uzza Distant, 1909
 Genus Exitelus Scudder, 1890
 Genus Getes Bergroth, 1916
 Tribe Gonianotini 
 Genus Alampes Horvath, 1884
 Genus Aoploscelis Fieber, 1861
 Genus Aphanus Laporte & de Castelnau, 1832
 Genus Armenoecus Kiritshenko & Scudder, 1973
 Genus Atrazonotus Slater & Ashlock, 1966
 Genus Bleteogonus Reuter, 1885
 Genus Claudinerobius Brailovsky, 1978
 Genus Delochilocoris Bergroth, 1893
 Genus Diomphalus Fieber, 1864
 Genus Emblethis Fieber, 1861
 Genus Facicoris Kiritshenko & Scudder, 1973
 Genus Gonianotus Fieber, 1861
 Genus Hyalocoris Jakovlev, 1874
 Genus Ischnopeza Fieber, 1861
 Genus Macrodema Fieber, 1861
 Genus Malezonotus Barber, 1918
 Genus Neurocladus Fieber, 1861
 Genus Parapolycrates Reuter, 1885
 Genus Pionosomus Fieber, 1861
 Genus Pterotmetus Amyot & Serville, 1843
 Genus Spinigernotus Scudder, 1984
 Genus Trapezonotus Fieber, 1861

 Tribe Lethaeini 
 Genus Adauctus Distant, 1909
 Genus Afromydrus Scudder, 1968
 Genus Aristaenetoides Kondorosy, 2006
 Genus Aristaenetus Distant, 1901
 Genus Atkinsonianus Distant, 1909
 Genus Austroxestus Woodward, 1962
 Genus Bubaces Distant, 1893
 Genus Camptocera Jakovlev, 1877
 Genus Carabocoris Gross, 1958
 Genus Cistalia Stal, 1874
 Genus Coleocoris Gross, 1958
 Genus Cryphula Stal, 1874
 Genus Diniella Bergroth, 1893
 Genus Esuris Stal, 1874
 Genus Exomyocara Slater & Woodward, 1974
 Genus Gonatoides Slater, 1957
 Genus Hexatrichocoris Kiritshenko, 1931
 Genus Lamproceps Reuter, 1882
 Genus Lampropunctus Scudder, 1971
 Genus Lethaeograndellus Scudder, 1962
 Genus Lethaeus Dallas, 1852
 Genus Lipostemmata Berg, 1879
 Genus Lophoraglius Wagner, 1961
 Genus Margolethaeus Zsalakovics & Kondorosy, 2014
 Genus Miogonates Sailer & Carvalho, 1957
 Genus Myocara Bergroth, 1916
 Genus Neolethaeus Distant, 1909
 Genus Neopetissius O’Donnell, 2001
 Genus Noteolethaeus Woodward & Slater, 1962
 Genus Orbellis Distant, 1913
 Genus Paragonatas Barber, 1939
 Genus Paramyocara Woodward & Malipatil, 1977
 Genus Petissius Distant, 1893
 Genus Porrectolethaeus Scudder, 1971
 Genus Ptilocamptocera Wagner, 1961
 Genus Rhaptus Stal, 1874
 Genus Scobinigaster Kondorosy & Banar, 2020
 Genus Stictolethaeus O'Donnell, 1991
 Genus Tuitocoris Cervantes, 2012
 Genus Valtissius Barber, 1918
 Genus Xestocoris Van Duzee, 1906
 Genus Liabaris Horvath, 1888
 Tribe Lilliputocorini 
 Genus Lilliputocoris Slater & Woodward, 1979
 Tribe Megalonotini 
 Genus Afralampes Slater, 1998
 Genus Allocentrum Bergroth, 1894
 Genus Anepsiocoris Puton, 1886
 Genus Anepsiodes Reuter, 1882
 Genus Dermatinoides Slater & Sweet, 1973
 Genus Hadrocnemis Jakovlev, 1881
 Genus Hispanocoris Costas & Vázquez, 1999
 Genus Icus Fieber, 1861
 Genus Lamprodema Fieber, 1861
 Genus Lasiocoris Fieber, 1861
 Genus Leptomelus Jakovlev, 1881
 Genus Megalonotus Fieber, 1861
 Genus Metastenothorax Reuter, 1884
 Genus Microthisus Lindberg, 1958
 Genus Pezocoris Jakovlev, 1875
 Genus Piezoscelis Fieber, 1870
 Genus Polycrates Stal, 1865
 Genus Proderus Fieber, 1861
 Genus Sphragisticus Stal, 1872
 Genus Tempereocoris Pericart, 1995
 Genus Tethallotrum Scudder, 1962
 Tribe Myodochini 
 Genus Acrolophyses Dellapé & Henry, 2010
 Genus Aegyptocoris China, 1936
 Genus Afrovertanus Scudder, 1962
 Genus Andercnemodus Brailovsky & Cervantes, 2011
 Genus Ashlockaria Harrington, 1980
 Genus Bacacephalus Harrington, 1980
 Genus Baranowskiobius Dellapé, Melo & Henry, 2016
 Genus Bergicoris Dellapé, 2010
 Genus Caenopamera Barber, 1918
 Genus Carpilis Stal, 1874
 Genus Catenes Distant, 1893
 Genus Cholula Distant, 1893
 Genus Cnemodus Herrich-Schaeffer, 1850
 Genus Distingphyses Scudder, 1962
 Genus Dushinckanus Brailovsky, 1979
 Genus Ereminellus Harrington, 1980
 Genus Erlacda Signoret, 1863
 Genus Eucosmetus Bergroth, 1894
 Genus Euparomius Hedge, 1990
 Genus Exopamera Distant, 1918
 Genus Exopamerana Malipatil, 1978
 Genus Fontathanus Scudder, 1963
 Genus Froeschneria Harrington, 1980
 Genus Gyndes Stal, 1862
 Genus Henicopamerana Malipatil, 1986
 Genus Henicorthaea Malipatil, 1978
 Genus Henryaria Dellapé, Melo & Montemayor, 2018
 Genus Heraeus Stal, 1862
 Genus Horridipamera Malipatil, 1978
 Genus Humilocoris Harrington, 1980
 Genus Incrassoceps Scudder, 1978
 Genus Kolenetrus Barber, 1918
 Genus Ligyrocoris Stal, 1872
 Genus Megacholula Harrington, 1980
 Genus Megapamera Scudder, 1975
 Genus Mimobius Poppius & Bergroth, 1921
 Genus Myodacanthus Dellapé, 2012
 Genus Myodocha Latreille, 1807
 Genus Myodorthaea Malipatil, 1978
 Genus Neocnemodus Dellapé & Malipatil, 2012
 Genus Neomyocoris Dellapé & Montemayor, 2008
 Genus Neopamera Harrington, 1980
 Genus Orthaea Dallas, 1852
 Genus Pachybrachius Hahn, 1826
 Genus Paisana Dellapé, 2008
 Genus Pamerana Distant, 1909
 Genus Pamerapa Malipatil, 1978
 Genus Pamerarma Malipatil, 1978
 Genus Paracholula Harrington, 1980
 Genus Paraheraeus Dellapé, Melo & Henry, 2016
 Genus Parapamerana Malipatil, 1980
 Genus Paraparomius Harrington, 1980
 Genus Paromius Fieber, 1861
 Genus Pephysena Distant, 1893
 Genus Perigenes Distant, 1893
 Genus Prytanes Distant, 1893
 Genus Pseudocnemodus Barber, 1911
 Genus Pseudolaryngodus Malipatil & Gao, 2019
 Genus Pseudopachybrachius Malipatil, 1978
 Genus Pseudopamera Distant, 1893
 Genus Pseudoparomius Harrington, 1980
 Genus Ptochiomera Say, 1831
 Genus Remaudiereana Hoberlandt, 1954
 Genus Scintillocoris Slater & Brailovsky, 1993
 Genus Shinckadunus Dellapé & Melo, 2020
 Genus Sisamnes Distant, 1893
 Genus Slaterobius Harrington, 1980
 Genus Stalaria Harrington, 1980
 Genus Stigmatonotum Lindberg, 1927
 Genus Stridulocoris Harrington, 1980
 Genus Suffenus Distant, 1904
 Genus Tenuicoris Slater & Harrington, 1974
 Genus Thoraea Dellapé & Montemayor, 2011
 Genus Togo Bergroth, 1906
 Genus Valonetus Barber, 1918
 Genus Villalobosothignus Brailovsky, 1984
 Genus Woodwardocoris Malipatil, 1978
 Genus Xenydrium Poppius & Bergroth, 1921
 Genus Zeridoneus Barber, 1918
 Genus Zeropamera Barber, 1948
 Genus †Catopamera Scudder, 1890
 Genus †Cophocoris Scudder, 1890
 Genus †Ctereacoris Scudder, 1890
 Genus †Eucorites Scudder, 1890
 Genus †Lithocoris Scudder, 1890
 Genus †Phrudopamera Scudder, 1890
 Genus †Procoris Scudder, 1890
 Genus †Stenopamera Scudder, 1890
 Genus Nesodromus Bergroth, 1905

 Tribe Ozophorini 
 Genus Allotrophora Slater & Brailovsky, 1983
 Genus Balboa Distant, 1893
 Genus Bedunia Stal, 1874
 Genus Bergidea Breddin, 1897
 Genus Brailovskyocoris Slater, 1994
 Genus Bryanellocoris Slater, 1957
 Genus Cervicoris Slater, 1982
 Genus Cryptotrophora Brailovsky & Barrera, 2016
 Genus Ethaltomarus Scudder, 1963
 Genus Gressittocoris Slater & Zheng, 1985
 Genus Icaracoris Slater, 1985
 Genus Longinischus Brailovsky, 2009
 Genus Longinomerus Brailovsky & Barrera, 2010
 Genus Lygofuscanellus Scudder, 1962
 Genus Marmottania Puton & Lethierry, 1887
 Genus Micrymenus Bergroth, 1921
 Genus Migdilybs Hesse, 1925
 Genus Neolonginischus Brailovsky & Barrera, 2016
 Genus Noualhieria Puton, 1889
 Genus Omacrus Bergroth, 1916
 Genus Ozophora Uhler, 1871
 Genus Pamozophora Ashlock & Slater, 1982
 Genus Paraporta Zheng, 1981
 Genus Porta Distant, 1903
 Genus Primierus Distant, 1901
 Genus Prosomoeus Scott, 1874
 Genus Pseudomenotelus Brailovsky & Cervantes, 2009
 Genus Pseudomenus Ashlock & Slater, 1982
 Genus Rugomenus Ashlock, 1985
 Genus Tachytatus Bergroth, 1918
 Genus Vertomannus Distant, 1903
 Tribe Phasmosomini 
 Genus Phasmosomus Kiritshenko, 1938
 Genus Prostemmidea Reuter, 1893
 Tribe Rhyparochromini 
 Genus Acroraglius Wagner, 1961
 Genus Aellopideus Seidenstucker, 1963
 Genus Aellopus Wolff, 1802
 Genus Altomarus Distant, 1903
 Genus Beosus Amyot & Serville, 1843
 Genus Callistonotus Horvath, 1906
 Genus Caprochromus Scudder, 1968
 Genus Caridops Bergroth, 1894
 Genus Cordillonotus Scudder, 1984
 Genus Cyrtocnemodon Eyles & Scudder, 1968
 Genus Dieuches Dohrn, 1860
 Genus Distadieuches Scudder, 1968
 Genus Ectyphoscelus Eyles, 1968
 Genus Elasmolomus Stal, 1872
 Genus Graphoraglius Wagner, 1961
 Genus Graptopeltus Stal, 1872
 Genus Lanchnophorus Reuter, 1887
 Genus Liolobus Reuter, 1885
 Genus Metadieuches Distant, 1918
 Genus Metochus Scott, 1874
 Genus Microtomideus Reuter, 1885
 Genus Naphiellus Scudder, 1962
 Genus Naphius Stal, 1874
 Genus Narbo Stal, 1865
 Genus Naudarensia Distant, 1904
 Genus Nocellochromus Scudder, 1963
 Genus Orieotrechus Scudder, 1962
 Genus Orphnotrechus Sweet, 1991
 Genus Panaorus Kiritshenko, 1951
 Genus Perimeda Reuter, 1887
 Genus Peritrechus Fieber, 1861
 Genus Phorcinus Stal, 1874
 Genus Plinthurgus Kiritshenko, 1911
 Genus Poeantius Stal, 1865
 Genus Quiobbesus Scudder, 1968
 Genus Ragliodes Reuter, 1885
 Genus Raglius Stal, 1872
 Genus Rhyparochromus Hahn, 1826
 Genus Rhyparoclava Kment, Hemala & BaŇar, 2016
 Genus Rhyparothesus Scudder, 1962
 Genus Rollathemus Scudder, 1963
 Genus Scudderocoris Dellapé, Melo, Montemayor & Kondorosy, 2017
 Genus Stizocephalus Eyles, 1970
 Genus Trichaphanus Kiritshenko, 1926
 Genus Uhleriola Horvath, 1908
 Genus Xanthochilus Stål, 1872
 Genus †Prolygaeus Scudder, 1890
 Genus Speusippas Distant, 1901
 Tribe Stygnocorini 
 Genus Acompus Fieber, 1861
 Genus Anneckocoris Slater, 1982
 Genus Arrianus Distant, 1904
 Genus Capenicola Slater & Sweet, 1970
 Genus Esuridea Reuter, 1890
 Genus Hyalochilus Fieber, 1861
 Genus Lasiosomus Fieber, 1861
 Genus Margareta White, 1878
 Genus Notiocola Slater & Sweet, 1970
 Genus Paracnemodus Slater, 1964
 Genus Stygnocoris Douglas & Scott, 1865
 Genus Stygnocorisella Hoberlandt, 1956
 Genus Sweetocoris O'Rourke, 1974
 Genus Tasmanicola Slater & Sweet, 1970
 Tribe Targaremini 
 Genus Australotarma Woodward, 1978
 Genus Baladeana Distant, 1914
 Genus Calotargemus Scudder, 1978
 Genus Forsterocoris Woodward, 1953
 Genus Geratarma Malipatil, 1977
 Genus Hebrolethaeus Scudder, 1962
 Genus Lachnophoroides Distant, 1914
 Genus Metagerra White, 1878
 Genus Millerocoris Eyles, 1967
 Genus Mirrhina Distant, 1920
 Genus Paramirrhina Malipatil, 1983
 Genus Paratruncala Malipatil, 1977
 Genus Popondochromus Dellapé & Henry, 2020
 Genus Regatarma Woodward, 1953
 Genus Ruavatua Miller, 1956
 Genus Sylvacligenes Scudder, 1962
 Genus Targarema White, 1878
 Genus Targarops Woodward, 1978
 Genus Truncala Woodward, 1953
 Genus Truncaloides Woodward, 1978
 Genus Trypetocoris Woodward, 1953
 Genus Woodwardiana Malipatil, 1977
 Tribe Udeocorini 
 Genus Astemmoplitus Spinola, 1852
 Genus Bathycles Distant, 1893
 Genus Cryptocoris Gross, 1962
 Genus Daerlac Signoret, 1881
 Genus Euander Stal, 1865
 Genus Fontejanus Breddin, 1904
 Genus Fontejus Stal, 1862
 Genus Insulicola Kirkaldy, 1908
 Genus Laryngodus Herrich-Schaeffer, 1850
 Genus Neosuris Barber, 1924
 Genus Porander Gross, 1962
 Genus Serranegra Lindberg, 1958
 Genus Telocoris Gross, 1962
 Genus Tempyra Stal, 1874
 Genus Udeocoris Bergroth, 1918
 Genus Udeopamera Slater, 1978
 Genus Zygocoris Gross, 1962
 Genus †Coptochromus Scudder, 1890
 Genus †Cryptochromus Scudder, 1890
 Genus †Linnaea Scudder, 1890
 Genus †Lithochromus Scudder, 1890
 Genus †Necrochromus Scudder, 1890
 Genus †Praenotochilus Theobald, 1937
 Genus †Tiromerus Scudder, 1890

References